Poi Dog Pondering is an American musical group which is noted for its cross-pollination of diverse musical genres, including various forms of acoustic and electronic music. Frank Orrall founded the band in Hawaii in 1984, initially as a solo project. In 1985 Orrall formed the first line-up of PDP to perform its first concert; at the Honolulu Academy of Arts. The band embarked on a yearlong street performance busking tour across North America. They eventually settled down in Austin, Texas in 1987, where they recorded their first three albums.  In 1992, the band relocated to Chicago and they began to incorporate orchestral arrangements and elements of electronic, house music, and soul music into their acoustic rock style. The membership of Poi Dog Pondering has evolved from album to album, with Frank Orrall being a constant player since the inception of the band.

Hawaii / Street performing years; members

During the Hawaii years (1985–1986), the band had the following lineup:
Frank Orrall – Guitar, vocals, marimba, penny whistle
Abra Moore – Guitar, vocals, accordion
Sean Coffey – Drums
John "el John" Nelson – Percussion
Kalea Chapman – Guitar, vocals
Jean Francois Berneron – Photographer, cook, vocals, recorder
Cliff Kamida – Guitar, harmonica
Ted Cho – Mandolin, guitar
Joe Espinda – Guitar, recording engineer
Matt Miller – Bass, vocals

Austin years; members

During the Austin years (1987–1992), the band had the following lineup:
Frank Orrall – guitar, tin flute, drums, vocals
Ted Cho – electric guitar, mandolin, bass
Dave Max Crawford – organ, trumpet, accordion
Darren Hess – drum kit (1991–1992)
Bruce Hughes – bass, vocals, guitar
John Nelson – congas, maracas, tom-toms, background vocals (1989–1992)
Dick Ross – drum kit (1987–1990)
Adam Sultan – electric guitar, acoustic guitar, vocals
Susan Voelz – violin, guitar, vocals

Additionally, the records featured literally dozens of musicians credited as "Satellite Poi Members".  Most prominent amongst these satellite members were vocalists Abra Moore and Malford Milligan, sound artist Ellen Fullman, drummer Sean Coffey and (on their third album) turntable operator Ashton "DJ Cassanova" Irons.

Beginning with that third album, 1992's Volo Volo, the band began to experiment with new musical styles, including fully incorporating DJ Cassanova into the line-up. Orrall's emerging interest in dance and house music led the band to relocate to Chicago in 1992, where it developed a loyal local following and was named best band by Chicago magazine in 1997 & "Best Pop and Rock Act" in the 2009 Chicago Readers Poll.

Early Chicago years; members

From 1993 to 1999, the band recorded the albums "Pomegranate" & "Natural Thing" and performed live with the following members in the lineup:
Frank Orrall – guitar, vocals
Dave Max Crawford – keyboards, clavinet
Paul Mertens – sax, clarinet, flute
Susan Voelz – violin
Dag Juhlin – guitar
Eddie Carlson – Bass
Brent Olds – bass
Tom Ray – Bass
Nick Kitsos – Drums
Steve Goulding – drums
Leddie Garcia – Percussion
Arlene Newson – backing vocals
Kornell Hargrove – backing vocals
Robert Cornelius – backing vocals

Satellite Members
Brigid Murphy – Alto Saxophone
Jason More – Berimbau
Lloyd Brodnax King – Alto Flute
Katherine Pisaro – Oboe

Mid Chicago years; members

From 1999 to 2013, (and for the album releases "In Seed Comes Fruit", "7" and "Audio Love Letter") the band had the following members in the lineup:

Frank Orrall – vocals, guitar, piano, synth. vibes, drums, samples, sequencing
Susan Voelz – violin, vocals
Paul Mertens – flute, sax, clarinet
Leddie Garcia – congas, bongos, ganzas, bells, shakers, various percussion
Kornell Hargrove – vocals
Ron Hall – bass
Rick Gehrenbeck – rhodes electric piano, clavinet, organ, synthesizers
Charlette Wortham – vocals
Alison Chesley – cello
Carla Prather – vocals
Tim Gant – piano, synthesizers
John "El John" Nelson – Percussion, drums
Earl A. Talbot – Drums
Dan Leali – Drums

Current Poi Dog Pondering Line-up; members

Frank Orrall – vocals, guitar, piano, synth. vibes, drums, samples, sequencing
Susan Voelz – violin, vocals
Dave Max Crawford – organ, piano, trumpet, trombone, flugelhorn, electric piano [Wurlitzer], clavinet, synthesizer, theremin
John Nelson – congas, bongos, drums, various percussion
Ted Cho – Guitar, Mandolin
Dag Juhlin – guitar
Kornell Hargrove – vocals
Ron Hall – bass
Rick Gehrenbeck – rhodes electric piano, clavinet, organ, synthesizers
Charlette Wortham – vocals
Robert Cornelius – vocals
Carla Prather – vocals
Ryan Murphy – Drums
Paul Mertens – flute, sax, clarinet

Discography

Early 4 track cassette albums
Poi Dog Pondering PDP X 1 (1984)
Poi Dog Pondering Soliloqui PDP X 2 (1985)
8 Songs by Poi Dog Pondering PDP X 3 (1985)
Poi Dog Pondering Thawing Spring PDP X 5 (1986)
Poi Dog Pondering Dig PDP X 4 (1986)
Hawaii to Texas (live 1987)
Vision Farming Hula Circus (live 1987)

Studio albums
Poi Dog Pondering (1989)
Wishing Like a Mountain and Thinking Like the Sea (1990)
Volo Volo (1992)
Pomegranate (1995)
Natural Thing (1999)
In Seed Comes Fruit (2003)
7 (2008)
Audio Love Letter (2011)
Everybody's Got a Star (2015)
Remnants of Summer (2018)

Other releases
Fruitless (EP) (1990)
Vague Gropings in the Slip Stream (Palm Fabric Orchestra) (1994)
Electrique Plummagram (Re-Mix Album) (1996)
That's the Way Love Is (Re-Mix EP) (1999)
Intermittent Transmissions from the SlipStream (Palm Fabric Orchestra) (2018)

Live albums
Liquid White Light (1997)
Soul Sonic Orchestra (2000)
Live at Metro Chicago (4-CD set, paired with DVD release, Dec 21, 2012)

Compilations
Sweeping Up the Cutting Room Floor (2001)
The Best of Poi Dog Pondering (The Austin Years) (2005)
Song Seeds of 7 (Demos and Outtakes) (2018)
Four on the Floor – Dance Floor Rarities and Remixes: 1994–2018 (2018)
Sweeping Up the Cutting Room Floor – Volume 2 (2018)

DVD releases
Audio Visivo (2004)
Live at Metro Chicago (2 DVD set, paired with CD release, Dec 21, 2012)

References

External links
Official site
[ Their page on] Allmusic
Poi Dog Pondering group page on FaceBook
Poi Dog Pondering MySpace page

Alternative rock groups from Illinois
Musical groups from Chicago
Musical groups from Hawaii
Musical groups established in 1984
1984 establishments in Hawaii
Columbia Records artists